Sheikh Faisal Abdur Rouf Mohammad Ziauddin Haider (known as Zia Haider; 18 November 1936 - 2 September 2008) was a Bangladeshi writer, poet, playwright, translator and professor. He was the founder president of Nagorik Natya Sampradaya and founder of the Bangladesh Institute of Theater Arts. He wrote 7 poems, 4 plays and translated several plays. He was awarded Ekushey Padak by the Government of Bangladesh in 2001 and Bangla Academy Literary Award in 1977.

Early life and education 
Haider was born on 18 November 1936 to Hakimuddin Sheikh and Rahima Khatun in Doharpara village in Pabna District of British India. He was the eldest among his brothers, Rashid Haider, Maqid Haider, Dawood Haider, Zahid Haider, Abid Haider and Arif Haider.

Career 
Haider started his career in journalism. In 1961, he joined the weekly Chitrali. Later, he joined as a professor at the Government Tolaram College, Narayanganj. Occasionally he took over as the officer of the Culture Department of Bangla Academy. After that he worked as a senior producer in Pakistan Television. He started teaching as an Assistant to the Department of Fine Arts of Chittagong University in 1970. He founded the Nagorik Natya Sampradaya. He established the Bangladesh Institute of Theater Arts (BETA).

References 

1936 births
2008 deaths
Rajshahi College alumni
Bangladeshi male writers
Bengali-language writers
Recipients of the Ekushey Padak
Recipients of Bangla Academy Award

Pabna Edward College alumni